RateMDs.com is a free website allowing users to submit and read reviews of doctors, dentists, psychologists, urgent care centers, group practices, and hospitals. The site is free to use for both consumers and doctors.

The site was originally launched in 2004, and has undergone a number of changes in recent years with a huge update in August 2014.

History 
RateMDs.com was founded in 2004 by John Swapceinski in San Jose, California. The site has been featured in numerous publications, including The Wall Street Journal and BuzzFeed.

Business model 
The site generates revenues through two means:

 Ad sales to physicians, health care facilities and insurance companies.
 Paid plans. For example: Any doctor may pay a fee of between US$119 and US$179 per month (between US$1,428 and US$2,148 per year) for the website's "Promoted Plan". This plan includes a variety of features, including the "Ratings Manager" which affords doctors the option to hide multiple negative reviews.

Ratings Manager (now withdrawn) 
The site's Ratings Manager was one of the features available only to doctors who pay a monthly fee. As marketing firm Mudbug Media puts it: "Physicians who have a paid plan are ... allowed to hide up to 3 RateMDs reviews 'deemed to be suspicious' and can select a featured rating to show up at the top of the reviews."  As a result of a ruling by the Office of the Privacy Commission of Canada, "Ratings Manager" was replaced by "Ratings Concierge" in August 2019 (see below) but this no longer appears to be available either.

Controversies 
RateMDs allows users to rate doctors anonymously.  This can result in ratings which appear to the doctor to be unfair or inaccurate 

Possible ways in which doctors can respond to unfair or inaccurate ratings include:
 Requesting that the rating be removed (usually met with a refusal)
 Responding online to the rating under their own name
 Paying RateMDs to remove the rating (as above, although this option has now been removed, see below)
 Paying a reputation management company to improve their profile
 Responding to the rating or adding positive reviews to their profile using a free tool like Tor Browser which circumvents the RateMDs restriction on multiple ratings from the same IP address

Under the heading "The Best Family Doctors / G.P.s in The World", six of the ten top rated physicians in this category are based in Greensboro, North Carolina (data correct as of 23 February 2022).  This is far more than one would expect by chance, and suggests a determined effort at "reputation management".

Formal complaints 
On 30 June 2020 a complaint against RateMDs by a dentist in British Columbia, Canada was upheld by the Office of the Privacy Commission of Canada. The OPC commented in their ruling that "RateMDs has created a platform that allows users to post reviews and ratings, including negative ones, of health professionals. Having created the conditions for negative reviews to be posted, RateMDs cannot generate revenue from them by charging for their takedown. Requiring health professionals to pay in order to remove reviews, and then requiring continued monthly payments to maintain their suppression, is a clear example of an inappropriate ‘pay-for-takedown’ practice, in contravention of subsection 5(3).  RateMDs initially disagreed with our Office’s position but ultimately agreed to implement our Office’s recommendation to cease offering this service. In August 2019, RateMDs replaced its Ratings Manager service plan with a new plan called ‘Ratings Concierge’. This service eliminates the ability of subscribers to hide any reviews from the website."

On 23 September 2020 an award of $50,000 damages and $16,000 costs to an Ontario physician was upheld by the Court of Appeal for Ontario. The physician sued the brother of a patient he had treated, together with RateMDs, for derogatory comments which the patient's brother had posted on the RateMDs website. The action against RateMDs was discontinued, although it is not clear on what basis.

Corporate structure 
VerticalScope Inc. is the parent company of RateMDs.  Torstar Corp, publisher of the Toronto Star, purchased a 56 per cent ownership in VerticalScope in 2015.  The Toronto Star has pursued an aggressive anti-doctor editorial policy for several years.

Physical location 
Rate MDs provides a confusing variety of possible physical locations. The Contact link on its website leads to an online form but no physical address. Its FAQs page gives an address for service of legal process with an agent Incorp Services in Westlake Village, California, but there is no evidence that the company physically conducts business in California.  The incorporation documents filed in California give an address for a registered office in Troy, Michigan but this may just be a mailing address. A Cayman Islands address also appears on the incorporation documents but this appears to be a vacation property. The website is registered with an agent Domains by Proxy based in Scottsdale, Arizona but this is just a provider of web hosting services. 

The corporate filing dated 30 August 2018 lists three company officers, Rob Laidlaw, Diane Yu and Vincenzo Bellissimo, all of whom appear to be based at 111 Peter Street Suite 901, Toronto, Ontario, Canada M5V 2H1. This is the same address as the parent company VerticalScope Inc, and some 2km away from the Toronto Star office at 1 Yonge Street, Toronto, Ontario, Canada  M5E 1E6. It is likely that the actual business of the company is conducted from one or both of these offices.

The corporate filing on 27 August 2019 lists the same three company officers but with a different address for Rob Laidlaw, now said to be at 94 Solaris Avenue, Suite 10301 Unit C, Camana Bay, KY1-1105, Cayman Islands. This appears to be the address of Lionfish Capital, Mr Laidlaw’s family investment firm.

The latest corporate filing on 26 August 2020 lists the same company officers and address details.

Legal position 
Although RateMDs appears to be physically based in Toronto, Canada, it is incorporated in the USA in order to take advantage of the more liberal freedom of speech legislation there.  The RateMDs website states: "The Communications Decency Act (the “CDA”) is a complete bar to our liability for the statements of others on this website: "No provider or user of an interactive computer service shall be treated as the publisher or speaker of any information provided by another information content provider." 47 U.S.C. § 230 ... The United States has enacted strict laws protecting US companies from lawsuits brought in foreign jurisdictions. Even if you win a judgment under your local laws, it will not be enforceable in the United States. See, e.g. SPEECH Act of 2010."  Individual users can, however, be sued, as in the example above, particularly if they are based in a non-USA jurisdiction.  A large proportion of RateMDs users are Canadian.

References

External links
 

American medical websites